Brooke Leslie Rollins (born April 10, 1972) is an American attorney who is the president and CEO of the America First Policy Institute. She previously served as the acting director of the United States Domestic Policy Council under President Donald Trump. Prior to assuming that role, Rollins oversaw the White House Office of American Innovation. Rollins was president and CEO of the Texas Public Policy Foundation, an Austin-based free-market think tank, from 2003 through 2018. During her tenure at TPPF, the think tank grew from having a staff of 3 to a staff of 100.

Rollins previously served as deputy general counsel, ethics advisor, and policy director to Texas Governor Rick Perry. She is an advocate of criminal justice reform.

Early life and education

Rollins was raised in Glen Rose, Texas and attended Texas A&M University, where she graduated cum laude with a B.S. in agricultural development in 1994. She was named the top graduate of her class based on a combination criteria of academics, leadership, and service. While at Texas A&M, Rollins was the first female to be elected student body president. She also served as the speaker pro tempore of the Student Senate, the chair of the Texas A&M Judicial Court, as a Fish Camp counselor, and was Cotton Bowl Classic Queen. In 2007, Rollins became the first female speaker at the College Station Aggie Muster, which honors deceased Texas A&M former students. 

Rollins earned a Juris Doctor from the University of Texas School of Law, graduating with honors.

Career 
After graduating from law school, Rollins worked for several years at Hughes & Luce, LLP in Dallas and clerked under U.S. Federal District Court judge Barbara M. Lynn.

In 2011, Texas Monthly named Rollins one of the 25 most powerful Texans.

Trump administration

Office of American Innovation
In February 2018, Rollins replaced Reed Cordish as Trump's assistant to the president for intergovernmental and technology initiatives and as a member of the Office of American Innovation.

Rollins was influential in encouraging the passage of the First Step Act, legislation that reforms the nation's prison system and seeks to reduce recidivism. The First Step Act was signed into law by President Trump in December 2018.

Domestic Policy Council
In May 2020, President Trump named Rollins acting director of the United States Domestic Policy Council.

In her first public interview as acting director of the Domestic Policy Council, Rollins said she was focused on bringing "together all sides of the table to figure out how we can move forward together." She said the U.S. "is a nation in mourning for the senseless death of George Floyd and the senseless loss of livelihood all over this country." Rollins struck an optimistic tone on the country's future, saying "this is America and we have been through difficult times before. We are a nation of doers and believers and dreamers, and we are a nation where if anybody tells us to step back, we step three feet forward."

Amid nationwide protests and racial unrest, Rollins said "we need everyone to rise above the division and the divide and come together." She said the White House was "working through a list of solutions and possibilities, bipartisan. How do we come together? How do we use this as a unifying force for this country?"

Rollins, along with Mark Meadows and U.S. Senator Tim Scott, developed the Safe Policing for Safe Communities executive order signed by President Trump in June 2020. The order incentivizes police reforms and encourages law enforcement to meet higher standards for the use of force and de-escalation training. The order bans chokeholds except when an officer's life is at risk. The order also creates a national database on excessive force complaints against police officers and encourages the involvement of mental health professionals when responding to nonviolent cases.

At an event announcing the signing of the new order, President Trump said his goal was to maintain law and order as well as justice and safety. He said "Reducing crime and raising standards are not opposite goals. They are not mutually exclusive. They work together." According to Politico, the order was crafted "in consultation with police officers, mayors, conservative African Americans, faith-based leaders and the families of victims."

Post-Trump administration
After Donald Trump's defeat in the 2020 presidential election, Rollins and Larry Kudlow began forming a new nonprofit organization focused on continuing to promote Trump's public policies. Rollins is the president and CEO of the America First Policy Institute, founded in 2021 to perpetuate Trump's public policy agenda.

Rollins is a leader of the Save America Coalition, launched in 2021 to oppose Joe Biden's $3.5 trillion economic proposal.

References

External links
Brooke Rollins at Ballotpedia

1972 births
Living people
People from Glen Rose, Texas
Texas A&M University alumni
Trump administration personnel
University of Texas School of Law alumni